The Chapan rebellion was one of the largest peasant uprising against the Bolsheviks during the Russian Civil War. Taking place in March-April 1919, the uprising covered the territory of Syzran, Sengileevsky, Karsunsky districts of Simbirsk and the Stavropol and Melekessky districts of Samara. It got its name from the clothes of the rebels: the chapan - a winter coat, made of sheepskin, a special robe belted with a sash, a popular clothing among the peasants of the region during cold weather. The uprising was brutally suppressed, and its participants, mostly peasants, were subjected to terror and mass repression.

Background 
It was caused by the requisitions of grain and forced levies that the villagers suffered at the hands of the Bolsheviks. At that time the white armies were preparing their advance from the Urals to Ufa, Izhevsk and Votkinsk, so the Bolsheviks required all the youth and food for defense. For this they used all possible means, including torture, and in many cases the requisitions turned into simple assaults, where the soldiers took even products not subject to collection, condemning their victims to hunger. In February 1919 the provincial authorities began to warn of the discomfort caused by these abuses but they were not listened to.

Rebellion 
Apparently, the managers allowed the gathering of the village in a carnival while doing the requisitions, taking more grain than usually required by the orders, which gave the outraged peasants the opportunity to organize and demand responsibilities. When the villagers learned that the Bolsheviks were calling for reinforcements, the soldiers were disarmed and the officials deposed.

The first soldiers sent to quell the movement went over to their side and shot their officers. They soon established a headquarters and the neighboring villages were added. They then set about persecuting the Bolsheviks and members of the Poor Peasant Committees (bodies through which they were governed), leaving the region in charge of Soviets without Bolshevik representation. When the authorities in Simbirsk found out on the afternoon of 5 March they ordered the immediate end of the movement and promised to send a committee to study the situation. Two days later, a delegation from the local Cheka issued an ultimatum demanding submission under penalty of harsh punishment.

Despite their poor weapons and little training, on 7 March the rebels captured Stavropol with the proclamation "All power to the workers! Down with the rule of the Bolsheviks!" and with hardly any fighting. They named the veteran lieutenant of World War I, as their leader, they published appeals, news and orders in the local newspaper, removed all Bolshevik iconography from public places, and began to make plans to seize the governorates of Samara and Simbirsk. That same day, the commander of the 4th Red Army, Valerian Kuybyshev, was put in charge of suppressing the revolt. Their plans were simple, to recover Stavropol, where the peasant leaders were, without fighting major battles. It was decided to send the komandarm Mikhail Frunze with 13,000 soldiers to crush the movement. They consisted of units withdrawn from the front, the 1st Samara Workers' Regiment and the 2nd International Company, formed by Hungarians, both units were armed with modern rifles and machine guns. They were reinforced with units of the 4th Army.

However, the region was restless and on 9 March the reserve regiment stationed in Samara mutinied. The following day, there was a state of siege in Syzran as peasants in the area rose up, destroying volost offices, burning documents and property and killing local Bolsheviks. Soon every Bolshevik or sympathizer in the region was hunted down and the imprisoned soldiers began to be tortured by submerging them in the icy waters of the Volga.

Within two weeks the movement spread through both governorates. Soon much of the Volga basin was in their hands. It was the first vosstaniye or great peasant rebellion that mobilized huge armies, conquered cities and had a coherent political program. The rebels demanded the abolition of requisitions, the free election of the Soviets and the end of the "Bolshevik commissarocracy". They came to have an army of thirty thousand men (although some historians raise the figure to one hundred or one hundred and fifty thousand).

Suppression 
On 13 March, the Syzransky Revolutionary Committee decreed the execution of all those involved in the insurrection. That same day, the units of the local Cheka and special units attacked Stavropol relying on cavalry and two machine guns, but were repulsed and many civilians fled to Syzran. A military detachment and members of the Komsomol led by Alexandra Smirnitskaya were also dispatched to take the village of Usinskoye, but were annihilated. Smirnitskaya, who was acting as a medical assistant, was killed with a club and by a stake driven through the throat. In the vicinity of the village of Eremkino, the rebels were commanded by Irina Felichkina, a veteran of a battalion of defenders of Petrograd, mounted and with a whip giving orders until she was captured and shot.

The next day, the army surrounded Stavropol and assaulted it, meeting little resistance because the rebels were poorly organized and dispersed. A few managed to break through the encirclement and flee to the town of Yagodnoye, the rest fell to enemy fire and others were captured. The officers were summarily shot or hanged. Novodeviche fell on 15 March.

By early April the revolt had been defeated, but the rebels were able to briefly seize the Bazarnaya train station, destroying the rails. The fighting ended in the middle of the month.

Consequences 
Villages were burned, there were mass arrests of peasants, a policy of executing one in ten prisoners was implemented, there were summary trials in Syzran, near which a concentration camp was built that was soon overcrowded, so they shot the remaining prisoners. In Samara, Frunze dedicated himself to looking for spies and traitors and the leaders of the uprising who were fleeing the persecution. Dolinin managed to hide in the forest until he turned to join the red armies, fighting against Anton Denikin and being captured in Rostov-on-Don but escaped, then participated in the Polish-Soviet war where he was wounded and in hospital wrote a letter requesting forgiveness from the Central Executive Committee, which granted it, returned to his native village and although he spent several years in prison during the 1930s, he was released and died naturally.

This rebellion favored Kolchak's White Army in their advance westward, in fact, his movement agents were officially blamed, and strengthened the military measures led by Leon Trotsky. It is estimated that it cost the lives of ten thousand peasants.

A new uprising broke out years later, on 24 January 1921. In the parish of Chuvasko-Sormin (uyezd of Yadrinskii, in neighboring Chuvash Autonomous Soviet Socialist Republic) between five and seven thousand peasants rose up against the requisitions, attacking the local police; but their uprising was crushed just three days later. The participants of these revolts were not rehabilitated until 1996 by decree of the Russian president Boris Yeltsin.

See also 
Tambov rebellion
Kronstadt rebellion
Green armies

References

Bibliography 
 
 
 
 
 
 

1919 in Russia
Russian Civil War
Peasant revolts
20th-century rebellions
Anti-Bolshevik uprisings
Political repression in Russia
Rebellions in Russia
Conflicts in 1919